NSƯT Kiều Tất Hưng (born 1937), also known as Kiều Hưng, is a Vietnamese singer of Vietnamese revolutionary songs. He was born in Hanoi. From 1968 to 1972, Hưng studied at the Kiev Conservatory, then at the Moscow Conservatory in 1991.

References

People from Hanoi
20th-century Vietnamese male singers
1937 births
Living people
Date of birth missing (living people)